Katja Minna Marita Holanti (born 5 April 1974) is a Finnish biathlete. She competed at the 1994, 1998 and the 2002 Winter Olympics.

References

1974 births
Living people
Biathletes at the 1994 Winter Olympics
Biathletes at the 1998 Winter Olympics
Biathletes at the 2002 Winter Olympics
Finnish female biathletes
Olympic biathletes of Finland